Tyjani Beztati (born October 21, 1997) is a Moroccan-Dutch kickboxer. He is a two-time Glory Lightweight Championship challenger and the current Glory Lightweight champion.  

As of August 2021, he is the #8 lightweight kickboxer in the world according to Combat Press.

Personal life
Beztati was born in Amsterdam to a Moroccan father and a Surinamese mother.

Kickboxing career

Glory

Early promotional career
He challenged Sitthichai Sitsongpeenong for the Glory Lightweight Championship at Glory 53: Lille on May 12, 2018. Sitthichai won the fight by a unanimous decision.

Beztati faced Christian Baya, who was likewise coming back from a loss, at Glory 59: Amsterdam on September 29, 2018. He won the fight by split decision. After successfully rebounding from his failed title bid, Beztati faced Stoyan Koprivlenski at Glory 62: Rotterdam on December 8, 2018. He won the fight by a unanimous decision. Beztati next faced fellow one-time Glory lightweight title challenger Josh Jauncey at Glory 65: Utrecht on May 17, 2019. He won the fight by unanimous decision.

Tyjani challenged Marat Grigorian for the Glory Lightweight Championship at Glory 69: Düsseldorf on October 12, 2019. Frigorian won the fight by a unanimous decision, with two scorecards of 50–44, two scorecards of 49–45 and once scorecard of 48–46.

Following his second failed title bid, Beztati was booked to face Michaël Palandre at Glory 75: Utrecht on February 29, 2020. He won the fight by a second-round technical knockout, as Palandre retired from the bout at the end of the round due to a broken arm.

Glory Lightweight champion
Beztati was booked to face Elvis Gashi at Glory 78: Arnhem for the vacant Glory Lightweight Championship. Despite a poor start to the fight, which saw him get knocked down in the first round, Beztati controlled the remaining four rounds and won the bout by unanimous decision. One judge scored the fight 48–45 in his favor, while the remaining four judges awarded him a 48–44 scorecard.

Beztati made his first Glory Lightweight championship defense against the one-time lightweight title challenger Josh Jauncey at Glory 80 Studio on May 14, 2022. The title bout was part on a three-fight card, available exclusively to viewers who purchased the Glory 80 pay per view. He won the fight by a second-round knockout, stopping Jauncey with a left hook at the 2:25 minute mark.

Beztati made his second title defense against the #1 ranked Glory lightweight contender Stoyan Koprivlenski at Glory: Collision 4 on October 8, 2022. Koprivlenski had earned his chance to challenge for the title with a unanimous decision win against Guerric Billet in a title eliminator at Glory 81: Ben Saddik vs. Adegbuy 2. Beztati retained the title by a split decision.

Beztati made his third title defense against the reigning Glory Featherweight (-65 kg) and RISE Super Lightweight (-65 kg) World champion Petpanomrung Kiatmuu9 at Glory 84 on March 11, 2023. He won the fight by a fourth-round knockout. Beztati was up 30–27 on all five of the judges scorecards at the time of the stoppage.

Championships and accomplishments
Glory
2021 Glory Lightweight Championship (one time, current)
Three successful title defenses

Professional kickboxing record

|-  style="background:#cfc;"
| 2023-03-11 || Win ||align=left| Petpanomrung Kiatmuu9 || Glory 84 || Rotterdam, Netherlands || KO (Front kick) || 4 || 1:42
|-
! style=background:white colspan=9 |
|-  style="background:#cfc;"
| 2022-10-08 ||Win ||align=left| Stoyan Koprivlenski || Glory: Collision 4 || Arnhem, Netherlands || Decision (Split) || 5 ||3:00
|-
! style=background:white colspan=9 |
|- style="background:#cfc;"
| 2022-05-14 || Win ||align=left| Josh Jauncey || Glory 80 Studio || Netherlands || KO (Left hook) || 2  || 2:25
|-
! style=background:white colspan=9 |
|- style="background:#cfc;"
| 2021-09-04 || Win ||align=left| Elvis Gashi || Glory 78: Rotterdam || Rotterdam, Netherlands || Decision (Unanimous) || 5 || 3:00
|-
! style=background:white colspan=9 |
|-
|-  bgcolor= "#CCFFCC"
|  2020-02-29 || Win || align="left" | Michaël Palandre || Glory 75: Utrecht || Utrecht, Netherlands || TKO (Broken Arm) || 2 || 3:00
|-  style="background:#FFBBBB;"
| 2019-10-12 || Loss||align=left| Marat Grigorian || Glory 69: Düsseldorf || Düsseldorf, Germany || Decision (Unanimous) || 5 || 3:00
|-
! style=background:white colspan=9 |
|-  bgcolor= "#CCFFCC"
| 2019-05-17|| Win ||align=left| Josh Jauncey || Glory 65: Utrecht || Utrecht, Netherlands || Decision (Unanimous) || 3 || 3:00
|-  bgcolor="#CCFFCC"
| 2018-12-08 || Win||align=left| Stoyan Koprivlenski || Glory 62: Rotterdam || Rotterdam, Netherlands || Decision (Unanimous) || 3 ||  3:00
|-  bgcolor= "#CCFFCC"
| 2018-09-29|| Win ||align=left| Christian Baya || Glory 59: Amsterdam || Amsterdam, Netherlands || Decision (Split) || 3 || 3:00
|-  style="background:#FFBBBB;"
| 2018-05-12 || Loss ||align=left| Sitthichai Sitsongpeenong || Glory 53: Lille  || Lille, France || Decision (Unanimous) || 5 ||  3:00
|-
! style=background:white colspan=9 |
|-  style="background:#CCFFCC;"
| 2018-03-03 || Win ||align=left| Anil Cabri || Glory 51: Rotterdam  || Rotterdam, Netherlands || TKO || 1 || 2:17
|-  style="background:#FFBBBB"
| 2017-12-09 || Loss ||align=left| Stoyan Koprivlenski || Glory 49: Rotterdam, Final  || Rotterdam, Netherlands || Decision (Unanimous) || 3 || 3:00
|-  style="background:#CCFFCC"
| 2017-12-09 || Win ||align=left| Niclas Larsen || Glory 49: Rotterdam, Semi Final  || Rotterdam, Netherlands || Decision (Unanimous) || 3 || 3:00
|- style="background:#CCFFCC;"
| 2017-09-30 || Win ||align=left| Yodkhunpon Sitmonchai || Glory 45: Amsterdam || Amsterdam, Netherlands || Decision (Unanimous) || 3 || 3:00
|-  style="background:#CCFFCC;"
| 2017-05-20 || Win ||align=left| Youssef Assouik || Glory: 41 Holland || Netherlands || Decision (Unanimous) || 3 || 3:00
|-  style="background:#CCFFCC;"
| 2017-03-25 || Win || align=left| Sabri Ben Henia || Glory 39: Brussels || Brussels, Belgium || TKO || 2 || 2:05
|-  style="background:#CCFFCC;"
| 2016-12-10 || Win || align=left| Andrej Bruhl || Glory 36: Collision || Germany || Decision (Unanimous) || 3 || 3:00
|- style="background:#CCFFCC;"
| 2016-10-16|| Win ||align=left| Nuri Kacar || ACB KB 8: Only The Braves || Netherlands || Decision || 3 || 3:00
|-  style="background:#CCFFCC;"
| 2016-04-28 || Win || align=left| Ilyas Rustamov || Tatneft Cup || Netherlands || Decision || 3 || 3:00
|-  style="background:#CCFFCC;"
| 2016-04-09 || Win || align=left| Melvin Wassing || Real Fighters || Netherlands || TKO || 2 ||
|-  style="background:#CCFFCC;"
| 2015-12-06 || Win || align=left| Rhassan Muhareb || Real Fighters A Night 2 || Netherlands || KO (Flying knee) || 1 || 2:50
|-  style="background:#fbb;"
| 2015-08-22 || Loss|| align=left| Yang Zhuo || Wu Lin Feng 2015 || Xiamen, China || Decision (Unanimous) || 3 || 3:00
|-  style="background:#FFBBBB;"
| 2015-03-07 || Loss || align=left| Ismael Benali || Fight League - The Beginning || Netherlands || Decision || 3 || 3:00
|-  style="background:#CCFFCC;"
| 2014-12-28 || Win || align=left| Marcisio Souza || The Machine Is Back || Paramaribo, Suriname || Decision (Unanimous) || 3 || 3:00
|-  style="background:#CCFFCC;"
| 2014-11-30 || Win || align=left| Sidy Barry || Real Fighters || Netherlands || Decision (Unanimous) || 3 || 3:00
|-  style="background:#CCFFCC;"
| 2014-05-25 || Win || align=left| Mohammed Didouh || Kickboxing Talents || Amsterdam, Netherlands || || ||
|-  style="background:#CCFFCC;"
| 2014-02-22 || Win || align=left| Rafik Kassi || Enfusion Live - Sportmani Events V || Netherlands || Decision (Unanimous) || 3 || 3:00
|-
| colspan=9 | Legend:    

|- style="background:#cfc;"
| 2013-06-29 || Win || align=left| Monir Tour || Death Before Dishonor III || Almere, Netherlands || Decision || || 
|-
|- style="background:#cfc;"
| 2011-11-26 || Win || align=left| Dylan Lesage || Mejiro Gym Event || Zaandam, Netherlands || Decision || || 
|-
|- style="background:#cfc;"
| 2011-03-28 || Win || align=left| Marcel Hadjali || DDFN 27 || Zaandam, Netherlands || DQ (Elbows) || 3 || 0:30
|-
! style=background:white colspan=9 |
|-
|- style="background:#cfc;"
| 2010-02-28 || Win || align=left| Roberto Spierings || Amsterdam Fightclub || Amsterdam, Netherlands || TKO ||  || 
|-
|- style="background:#cfc;"
| 2009-06-28 || Win || align=left| Dylan Lesage || Slamm!! - "New Generation" || Amsterdam, Netherlands || || || 
|-
|- style="background:#cfc;"
| 2009-05-31 || Win || align=left| Andy Oosterling || Next Generation Warriors III || Utrecht, Netherlands || Decision || || 
|-
|- style="background:#c5d2ea;"
| 2009-05-23|| Draw || align=left| Majib Sultani || Dangerzone || Amsterdam, Netherlands || Decision (Draw) || 3 || 1:00
|-
| colspan=9 | Legend:

See also
 List of male kickboxers

References

External links
Glory profile

Living people
1995 births
Sportspeople from Amsterdam
Dutch male kickboxers
Moroccan male kickboxers
Lightweight kickboxers
Dutch sportspeople of Surinamese descent